Rosanell Eaton (April 14, 1921 – December 8, 2018) was an American civil rights worker. She was born on a farm near Louisburg, North Carolina. When she was 21 years old, Eaton became one of the first African Americans to vote in her county after completing a literacy test. She registered more than 4,000 citizens to vote in North Carolina.

In August 2015, President Obama, in his response to the New York Times cover story on "Efforts over the last 50 years to dismantle the protections in the Voting Rights Act of 1965", wrote that he was inspired by people like Rosanell Eaton.

References

1921 births
2018 deaths
Activists for African-American civil rights
People from Louisburg, North Carolina
Activists from North Carolina